Graeme Leonard West (born 5 December 1953) is a New Zealand former rugby league footballer and coach. Standing at six-foot, five inches, he played in the forwards, captaining English club Wigan Warriors. West also played representative rugby league for New Zealand and is the father of Super League player, Dwayne West.

Playing career

West was selected to play for the New Zealand national team in the 1975 World Cup tournament. He was signed by English club Wigan  for the 1982–83 Rugby Football League season from New Zealand side Taranaki. He was actually 29 when he signed, though Wigan believed him to be 2 years younger. Within weeks of him making his début, he played left- in the 15–4 victory over Leeds in the 1982–83 John Player Trophy Final during the 1982–83 season at Elland Road, Leeds on Saturday 22 January 1983. He became captain in 1984, leading Wigan to Wembley for the 1984 Challenge Cup Final, which was lost to Widnes. He captained Wigan to victory in the 1985 Challenge Cup Final. West was a non playing substitute for defending champions Wigan in their 1987 World Club Challenge victory against the visiting Manly-Warringah Sea Eagles. He retired from the first team in 1989 to lead the reserve 'A' Team as player-coach, but made a late appearance against Castleford in 1991 due to injuries and a fixture pile up, scoring a try late in the game that gained a standing ovation.

Graeme West played left- and scored a try in Wigan's 18–26 defeat by St. Helens in the 1984 Lancashire Cup Final during the 1984–85 season at Central Park, Wigan, on Sunday 28 October 1984, played left- in Wigan's 34–8 victory over Warrington in the 1985 Lancashire Cup Final during the 1985–86 season at Knowsley Road, St. Helens, on Sunday 19 October 1986, and played as an interchange/substitute (replacing  Shaun Wane), and scored a try in the 28–16 victory Warrington in the 1987 Lancashire Cup Final during the 1987–88 season at Knowsley Road, St. Helens, on Sunday 11 October 1987.

Graeme West played left- (replaced by interchange/substitute Brian Case) in Wigan's 15–4 victory over Leeds in the 1982–83 John Player Trophy Final during the 1982–83 season at Elland Road, Leeds on Saturday 22 January 1983, played left- in the 11–8 victory over Hull Kingston Rovers in the 1985–86 John Player Special Trophy Final during the 1985–86 season at Elland Road, Leeds on Saturday 11 January 1986, and played left- in the 18–4 victory over Warrington in the 1986–87 John Player Special Trophy Final during the 1986–87 season at Burnden Park, Bolton on Saturday 10 January 1987.

Coaching career
In 1994, following the sacking of John Dorahy, West was appointed as coach of Wigan, after fans petitioned for him to get the job. In his first month as coach, at the end of the 1993–94 Rugby Football League season West secured the First Division Premiership Trophy against Castleford, and then travelled with Wigan to Brisbane, guiding them in their 1994 World Club Challenge victory over Australian premiers, the Brisbane Broncos - The first time it was won by an English team in Australia. At the end of his first full season, he and the team won the League Championship, Challenge Cup, Regal Trophy, and Premiership - the 'Grand Slam' of all 4 trophies. Even though Wigan dominated Rugby League from 1985 to 1995, it was the only season the club achieved this feat. During the 1994 Kangaroo tour Wigan hosted a match against the Australian national team but couldn't pull off a win. Despite a second half comeback, the tourists won the match 30 - 20.

West stayed on in that position until February 1997 when, following an early exit from the Challenge Cup in 2 consecutive years, he was replaced by Eric Hughes.

After leaving Wigan, West spent short spells at Lancashire Lynx and Widnes Vikings.

Legacy
In 2008 West was named in the Taranaki Rugby League Team of the Century. He still lived and worked in Wigan up to the early 2010s, but then returned to his native New Zealand.

References

Sources
 Graeme West Wigan Playing Career Page  on the Wigan RL Fansite.
 Graeme West Wigan Coaching Career Page  on the Wigan RL Fansite.
Graeme West at wiganwarriors.com

1953 births
Living people
Central Districts rugby league team players
New Zealand national rugby league team captains
New Zealand national rugby league team players
New Zealand expatriate sportspeople in England
New Zealand rugby league coaches
New Zealand rugby league players
North Island rugby league team players
Rugby league second-rows
Taranaki rugby league team players
Widnes Vikings coaches
Wigan Warriors captains
Wigan Warriors coaches
Wigan Warriors players